2019 college football season may refer to:

American leagues
2019 NCAA Division I FBS football season
2019 NCAA Division I FCS football season
2019 NCAA Division II football season
2019 NCAA Division III football season
2019 NAIA football season

Non-American leagues
2019 U Sports football season